The Chana Star S460 is a microvan produced by Changan Automobile under the Chana sub-brand.

Overview

The Chana Star S460 was released by Changan Automobile in 2008. The Chana Star S460 microvan is powered by two engines, including an 82 kW 1.3-liter engine and a 1.0-liter engine. Prices for the Star S460 ranges from 35,500 yuan to 47,900 yuan.

Kuayue Chana V3
After the discontinuation of the Chana Star S460, an extended production of the rebadged version was produced by Chongqing Kuayue Automobile Co.,Ltd and sold under the Changan Kuayue sub-brand as the Kuayue Chana V3. The Kuayue Chana V3 is essentially the same vehicle as the pre-facelift Star S460 minus the redesigned front end.

Changhe Fuyun
The Changhe Fuyun is a rebadged version of the Chana Star S460 by Changhe sold from 39,800 to 41,800 yuan.

Hafei Junyi
A badge engineered model called the Hafei Junyi was launched in 2011, a year after Changan became the owner of Hafei. The Junyi features a redesigned front end and slightly revised rear, with the wheelbase unchanged, the revised length was shortened to 4025mm, width narrowed down to 1645mm, and height lowered to 1910mm. The Junyi is available with a 1.3 liter engine producing 99hp and 120Nm of torque.

References

Chana Star S460
Vans
Microvans
Rear-wheel-drive vehicles
Cars of China
Cars introduced in 2012